"Last Year" is a song recorded by singer-songwriter Lucie Silvas, released as the first single off her second album The Same Side in the UK. Formerly, "Everytime I Think of You" was released as the first single in the Netherlands, which has already peaked at the number one position.

Formats and track listings

Chart performance

Charts

References

Lucie Silvas songs
2006 singles
Songs written by Judie Tzuke
Songs written by Lucie Silvas
2006 songs
Mercury Records singles